István Kerek (born 12 December 1964) is a Hungarian weightlifter. He competed in the men's lightweight event at the 1988 Summer Olympics.

References

1964 births
Living people
Hungarian male weightlifters
Olympic weightlifters of Hungary
Weightlifters at the 1988 Summer Olympics
Sportspeople from Debrecen